Kenneth James Crawford (September 7, 1898 – March 9, 1957) was a professional American football player, who played in the early National Football League for the Akron Pros, Hammond Pros, Dayton Triangles and Cincinnati Celts. As a member of the 1920 Akron Pros, Crawford won the very first NFL Championship with the team. Prior to his professional career, he played at the college level at Miami University.

References

External links

1898 births
1957 deaths
Players of American football from Ohio
Miami RedHawks football players
Akron Pros players
Cincinnati Celts players
Dayton Triangles players
Hammond Pros players